Robert Braet (11 February 1912, in Bruges – 23 February 1987, in Bruges) was a tall Belgian goalkeeper. He never played for any other football team besides Cercle Brugge. Braet is seen as one of the biggest monuments in the team's history. He was on the Belgium national team that took part in the 1938 FIFA World Cup.

Career
Braet made his debut for Cercle when he had just turned 18, in a 0-1 away win against Lierse. He would quite immediately achieve his place in the starting eleven. In 1948, when Braet finished his career as goalkeeper, he had made 352 appearances for Cercle. Only 5 players do better. Braet was also chairman of Cercle Brugge from 1967 until 1970. There are 3 other former Cercle chairmen who have ever played for the green and black side: the others are Raoul Daufresne de la Chevalerie (35 appearances and 5 goals), Léon De Meester and Edgard De Smedt (both 1 appearance and 0 goals).

Braet has named a trophy after him, which is awarded every 2-year to the person who has made himself voluntarily most useful for the team.

References
 Information about former presidents of Cercle Brugge 
 Cerclemuseum.be 

1912 births
1987 deaths
Belgian footballers
Cercle Brugge K.S.V. players
Association football goalkeepers
Footballers from Bruges
Belgium international footballers
1938 FIFA World Cup players
Belgian football chairmen and investors
Belgian Pro League players